News Radio may refer to:

 NewsRadio, the NBC sitcom which aired from 1995–1999
 News radio or All-news radio, the all-news or news/talk radio format
 ABC News, an Australian Broadcasting Corporation radio service 
 ABC News Radio, formerly ABC Radio News, a radio service in the United States